Darmstadt South station is in the city of Darmstadt in the German state of Hesse on the Main-Neckar Railway. The station building is protected under the Hessian Monument Protection Act. It is classified by Deutsche Bahn as a category 5 station.

History

The first station was built on the old route of the Main-Neckar Railway, at the corner of Donnersbergring and Bessunger Straße on 15 October 1879 as Haltepunkt Bessungen (Bessungen halt); it was called Darmstadt Süd from 27 November 1902. It was served by passenger and freight services. With the construction of the Darmstadt Hauptbahnhof from 1909 to 1912, the Main-Neckar Railway was shifted to the west and lowered and a new Darmstädt South station was built.

The station building was acquired as part of a package with other station buildings by the British real estate investment company, Patron Capital on 1 January 2008.

Architecture
The new station was designed in neoclassical and traditional styles by the architect of the Mainz railway division (Eisenbahndirektion), Friedrich Mettegang. The cubic building has a rendered facade and windows with horizontal bars and shutters. A balcony standing on five square pillars points to the street front. The upper building is topped by a hip roof, and on the east side it has a "bat" dormer (Fledermausgaube) with a central round clock. The dormer windows have wood paneling, decorated by tapes and diamond motifs and turned round columns.

Rail services
The station is served by Regionalbahn service RB 66: Heidelberg–Weinheim–Bensheim–Darmstadt Hbf–Frankfurt. Since the timetable change of 2011/2012 on 11 December 2011, the station has been served by the Regionalbahn RB 66 (the Pfungstadtbahn) from Darmstadt to Pfungstadt. This runs in the peak hour, after stopping at Darmstadt Hauptbahnhof, continuing to Groß-Umstadt Wiebelsbach /Erbach as RB 81 or RE 81.

The South station also has a stop on bus route H (between Darmstadt Anne-Frank-Straße and Darmstadt Alfred-Messel-Weg or Kranichstein Kesselhutweg) operated by HEAG mobilo, Darmstadt's municipal transport company.

Notes

References

External links

Süd
Railway stations in Germany opened in 1912